Ecem Alıcı (born January 1, 1994 in Ankara, Turkey) is a Turkish volleyball player. She plays in the Aydın Büyükşehir Belediyespor, which competes in the Turkish Women's Volleyball League. Alıcı is a member of the Turkey women's youth national volleyball team, and wears number 14.

A native of Ankara, she began with volleyball sport in 2004 at Türk Telekom Ankara Sport Club, where she was coached by Mehmet Akın Akyıldız and Güzin Teksoy. During her two-year educating at the TVF Sport High School in her hometown, she played for the high school's team. After graduating from the high school, she enrolled at Yeditepe University in Istanbul to study industrial engineering. Alıcı was transferred in July 2011 by the Istanbul-based Galatasaray Volleyball.

Clubs
  Türk Telekom Ankara (2004-2009)
  TVF Sport High School (2009-2011)
  Galatasaray (2011-2012)
  Çanakkale Belediye (2013-2014)
  Maltepe Yalı Spor (2014-2015)
  Galatasaray (2015-2016)
  Bolu Belediyespor (2016-2017)
  Balıkesir BBSK (2017-2018)
  Aydın Büyükşehir Belediyespor (2018-)

Awards

National team
2011 FIVB Girls Youth World Championship - 
2011 European Youth Summer Olympic Festival - 
2012 Women's Junior European Volleyball Championship -

Club
 2011-12 Turkish Cup -  Runner-up, with Galatasaray Daikin
 2011-12 CEV Cup -  Runner-up, with Galatasaray Daikin
 2012 Turkish Volleyball Super Cup -  Runner-Up, with Galatasaray Daikin
 2012-2013 Turkish Women's Volleyball Cup -  Bronze Medal with Galatasaray Daikin

See also
 Turkish women in sports

References

1994 births
Sportspeople from Ankara
Living people
Turkish women's volleyball players
Galatasaray S.K. (women's volleyball) players
Aydın Büyükşehir Belediyespor volleyballers
21st-century Turkish sportswomen